Bleikvassli Church is a parish church of the Church of Norway in Hemnes Municipality in Nordland county, Norway. It is located in the village of Bleikvasslia. It is the church for the Bleikvassli parish which is part of the Indre Helgeland prosti (deanery) in the Diocese of Sør-Hålogaland. The red, wooden church was built in a long church style in 1955 using plans drawn up by the architect Torgeir Alvsaker. The church seats about 190 people.

See also
List of churches in Sør-Hålogaland

References

Hemnes
Churches in Nordland
Wooden churches in Norway
20th-century Church of Norway church buildings
Churches completed in 1955
1955 establishments in Norway
Long churches in Norway